Colophon berrisfordi is a species of beetle in family Lucanidae. It is endemic to South Africa.

References

Lucaninae
Insects of South Africa
Taxonomy articles created by Polbot
Beetles described in 1932